The Nigerian National Assembly delegation from Plateau comprises three Senators representing Plateau South, Plateau Central, and Plateau North, and eight   Representatives representing  Pankshin/Kanke/Kanam, Bassa/Jos North, Mikang/Quan.Pan/Shendam, Jos South/East, Langtang North/South, Barkin Ladi/Riyom, Wase, Mangu/Bokkos

Fourth Republic

9th Assembly (2019–2023)

8th Assembly (2015–2019)

The 4th Parliament (1999 - 2003)

References
Official Website - National Assembly House of Representatives (Plateau State)
 Senator List

Plateau State
National Assembly (Nigeria) delegations by state